Al'bov Rocks is a cluster of rock outcrops close south of Cape Spieden on the west side of Porpoise Bay, Antarctica. Charted by the Soviet Antarctic Expedition (1958) and named for Nikolay M. Al'bov (1806–99), Russian botanical geographer, explorer of Tierra del Fuego.

References

Rock formations of Wilkes Land